The International Journal of Management Reviews is a quarterly peer-reviewed academic journal, established by Cary Cooper in 1999, and published by Wiley-Blackwell on behalf of the British Academy of Management. It is the leading global review journal in organisation and management studies. The current editors are Jamie Callahan (Durham University), Marian Iszatt-White (Lancaster University) and Joaquín Alegre (University of Valencia). IJMR complements the British Journal of Management, which is also produced by the British Academy of Management.  

The journal is known for publishing literature reviews, which are said to play a key role "in shaping the emergence and development of theory within a field of study. Reviews allow the author to take stock of what scholars have done, and then put forward new conceptualizations and directions for future research...". The journal covers all main fields of management studies: from entrepreneurship and organizational behaviour to strategic management and finance. Each issue contains between five and six articles, which examine the relevant academic scholarship published on a specific aspect of a management sub-discipline. 

The journal does not accept purely descriptive literature reviews. The stated mission of the journal is for articles "...to make significant conceptual contributions, offering a strategic platform for new directions in research, and making a difference to how scholars might conceptualise research in their respective fields...". In addition to standard journal submissions, the journal publishes articles as part of two special sections: Debate Essays (responses to articles published in the journal) and Methodology (articles addressing innovative methods to undertake literature reviews). Furthermore, at least one special topical issue is guest edited by leading scholars in the field every year.

Rankings 
According to the 2021 Journal Citation Reports, the International Journal of Management Reviews has an impact factor of 8.958, ranking it 31th out of 228 journals in the category "Management" and 28th out of 155 journals in the category "Business". In addition, it was rated as an "A" class journal in the "Business and Management" category of the Excellence in Research for Australia rankings.

Past Co-Editors-in-Chief 

 Cary L Cooper (founding editor), University of Manchester, UK; 1999-2001
 Alan Pearson (founding editor), University of Manchester, UK; 1999-2001
 Andrew W Stark, University of Manchester, UK; 2002-2004
 Steve Armstrong, University of Lincoln, UK; 2004-2009
 Adrian Wilkinson, Griffith University, Australia; 2004-2009
 Allan Macpherson, University of Wisconsin - La Crosse, USA; 2010-2012
 Kamel Mellahi, Dubai Chamber of Commerce and Industry, Dubai; 2013
 Oswald Jones, University of Liverpool, UK; 2010-2016
 Caroline Gatrell, University of Liverpool, UK; 2014-2020
Katie Bailey, King's College London, UK; 2020-2021
Dermot Breslin, Rennes School of Business, France; 2017-2022

References

External links 
 
 British Academy of Management

Business and management journals
Wiley-Blackwell academic journals
English-language journals
Publications established in 1999
Quarterly journals
Academic journals associated with learned and professional societies